Mihály Korhut (born 1 December 1988) is a Hungarian professional footballer who plays as a left back for Debreceni EAC and the Hungary national team.

Club career
Korhut was born in Debrecen. On 26 November 2006, he made his debut for Debreceni VSC in a 6–1 home loss over FC Sopron. On 1 May 2012, he won the Hungarian Cup with Debrecen by beating MTK Budapest on penalty shoot-out in the 2011–12 season. This was the fifth Hungarian Cup trophy for Debrecen. On 12 May 2012, Korhut won the Hungarian League title with Debrecen after beating Pécs in the 28th round of the Hungarian League by 4–0 at the Oláh Gábor út Stadium, which resulted the sixth Hungarian League title for the Hajdús.

On 29 August 2016, he signed a three years contract with Israeli club Hapoel Be'er Sheva on a transfer fee in the range of €500,000.

On 12 January 2019, he signed a contract with Aris of the Superleague on a free-transfer. On 5 May 2019, in the last matchday of the 2018–19 season, Korhut scored his first goal for the club in a remarkable 7–2 home win against Xanthi.

On 6 June 2020, he sealed a 3–1 home win against OFI for the 2019–20 Superleague playoffs after an 80-day enforced COVID-19 break.

On 22 July 2020, he signed with Debrecen on a free transfer.

On 20 July 2022, Korhut joined Debreceni EAC.

International career
Korhut was selected for the Hungary national team's Euro 2016 squad.

Korhut played in the last group match in a 3–3 draw against Portugal at the Parc Olympique Lyonnais, Lyon on 22 June 2016.

Career statistics

Club

International

Scores and results list Hungary's goal tally first, score column indicates score after each Korhut goal.

Honours
Debrecen
 Hungarian League: 2009-2010, 2011-2012, 2013-2014
 Hungarian Cup: 2009-2010, 2011-2012, 2012-2013
 Hungarian League Cup: 2009–10

Hapoel Be'er Sheva
Toto cup top Division: 2016–17
Israeli Premier League: 2016–17
Israel Super Cup: 2017

References

External links
Debreceni VSC Official Website
Hivatasos Labdarugok Szervezete
UEFA Official Website
Mihály Korhut profile at magyarfutball.hu

1988 births
Living people
Sportspeople from Miskolc
Hungarian footballers
Association football defenders
Hungary international footballers
Debreceni VSC players
Létavértes SC players
Kaposvári Rákóczi FC players
Hapoel Be'er Sheva F.C. players
Aris Thessaloniki F.C. players
Debreceni EAC (football) players
Nemzeti Bajnokság I players
Israeli Premier League players
Super League Greece players
UEFA Euro 2016 players
Hungarian expatriate footballers
Expatriate footballers in Israel
Hungarian expatriate sportspeople in Israel
Expatriate footballers in Greece
Hungarian expatriate sportspeople in Greece